Kathryn (Kitty) Kish Sklar (born December 1939) is an American historian, author, and professor. Her work focuses on the history of women's participation in social movements, voluntary organizations, and American public culture.

Life and career 
Sklar was born on December 26, 1939, in Columbus, Ohio. She received a Bachelor of Arts (1965) degree from Harvard College and Radcliffe College, graduating magna cum laude in history and literature. She received a Master of Arts (1967) and Ph.D. (1969) from University of Michigan in U.S. and comparative history.

After completing her Ph.D, Sklar worked as a lecturer and assistant professor at University of Michigan (1969-1974) before becoming an Associate Professor (1974-1981) and Professor (1981-1988) of History at the University of California Los Angeles. She served as Distinguished Professor of History at the Binghamton University from 1988-2012 and became a Distinguished Professor Emerita at Binghamton University in 2012.

At UCLA, Sklar created the "Workshop on Teaching U.S. Women's History."

In 1997, Sklar received a grant from the National Endowment for the Humanities to begin the Women in Social Movements in the United States 1600-2000 project as a senior seminar at Binghamton University. The project rapidly expanded to become one of the premier resources online for the study of U.S. women's history. The site includes over one hundred document projects, and Sklar continues to release biannual editions of new document projects and full-text sources for the study of women's history with historian Thomas Dublin.

From 2005-2006 Sklar was the Harmsworth Professor of U.S. History at Oxford University.

Sklar currently resides in Berkeley, California, with her partner Thomas Dublin.

Fellowships, grants, and awards

Fellowships and grants 
 2007, Resident Scholar, Organization of American Historians
 2005-2006, Harmsworth Professor of U.S. History, University of Oxford
 2004-2006, Grant Recipient, National Historical Publications and Records Commission
 2003-2004, Grant Recipient, National Endowment for the Humanities
 2000-2002, University Scholar-in-Residence Award, American Association of University Women Educational Foundation
 1998-1999, Fellow, National Endowment for the Humanities
 1995-1996, Fellow, National Humanities Research Center
 1992-1993, Fellow, Woodrow Wilson International Center for Scholars
 1987-1988, Fellow, Center for Advanced Study in the Behavioral and Social Sciences, Stanford University
 1984-1985 (postponed to 1985-1986), Fellow, Guggenheim Fellowship
 1981-1982, Fellow, Rockefeller Foundation Humanities Fellowship
 1973-1974, Grant Recipient, Ford Foundation Faculty Research Grant for the Study of Women in Society

Awards 
 1996, Berkshire Book Prize
 1974, Berkshire Book Prize

Works

See also
 Jewish Women's Archive

References

External sources
 Women and Social Movements, International 1840-Present

1939 births
Living people
Radcliffe College alumni
American women historians
Binghamton University faculty
University of Michigan alumni
21st-century American women